This is a list of coralline algae species in the British Isles.

Boreolithon van-heuckii 
Choreonema thuretii
Corallina elongata
Corallina officinalis
Haliptilon squamatum 
Jania rubens 
Lithophyllum crouaniorum 
Lithophyllum dentatum 
Lithophyllum duckerae 
Lithophyllum fasciculum
Lithophyllum hibernicum
Lithophyllum incrustans
Lithophyllum nitorum 
Lithophyllum orbiculatum 
Titanoderma corallinae 
Titanoderma laminariae
Titanoderma pustulatum 
Hydrolithon boreale 
Hydrolithon cruciatum
Hydrolithon farinosum
Hydrolithon samoënse 
Hydrolithon sargassi 
Pneophyllum confervicola 
Pneophyllum coronatum 
Pneophyllum fragile 
Pneophyllum limitatum 
Pneophyllum lobescens 
Pneophyllum myriocarpum
Exilicrusta parva 
Lithophytum bornetii 
Lithophytum elatum 
Lithophytum laeve 
Lithothamnion corallioides 
Lithothamnion glaciale 
Lithothamnion lemoineae
Lithothamnion sonderi 
Melobesia membranacea 
Mesophyllum lichenoides
Phymatolithon brunneum 
Phymatolithon calcareum
Phymatolithon laevigatum
Phymatolithon lamii 
Phymatolithon lenormandii 
Phymatolithon purpureum

References

 Morton, O. and Chamberlain, Y.M. 1985. Records of some epiphytic coralline algae in the northeast of Ireland. Ir. Nat. J. 21: 436 - 440.
 Morton, O. and Chamberlain, Y.M. 1989. Further records of encrusting coralline algae on the north-east coast of Ireland. Ir. Nat. J.  23: 102 - 106.
 Woelkerling, W.J. 1993. Type collections of Corallinales (Rhodophyta) in the Foslie Herbarium (TRH). Gunneria 67 1 - 289.

Coralline algae in the British Isles
Seaweeds
Coralline algae species